The Goldfields Football League is an Australian rules football league based in the Goldfields region of Western Australia. Founded in 1896 as Hannans District Football Association, the league enjoyed a seat and full voting rights on the Australian National Football Council until 1919.  The first clubs to play Australian football were formed within the region, and the league helped popularise the sport in the region, helping to establish the sport and supplant Rugby in popularity. The GFL was known as the Goldfields Football Association (GFA) from 1901–07 and 1920–25, and as the Goldfields National Football League (GNFL) from 1926–87.

The league currently has two teams based in Kalgoorlie, two teams based in Boulder, and one in Kambalda.

History 
The league was formed during a meeting held in the Great Boulder Hotel, Kalgoorlie, on 29 July 1896 as the Hannans District Football Association. The association at this point comprised four teams; Boulder City, based in Boulder; Hannans, now known as Kalgoorlie City and based in Kalgoorlie; Victorians, also based in Kalgoorlie; and White Feather, based in Kanowna. Up until the end of the First World War the GFL was considered equal on ability with the WAFL, and a State Championship was contested 12 times between 1903 and 1924, with Goldfields sides winning twice, in 1903 and 1912. The league also had a seat and full voting rights on the Australian National Football Council until 1919, but participated together with the WAFL as Western Australia in inter-state and inter-colonial matches. The 1904 Western Australian inter-state touring team included seven GFL players, and half of the 1908 Melbourne Carnival team were GFL players, including the captain Billy Trewhella.

Clubs

Current clubs

Former clubs
Former clubs include Victorians (1896–97), White Feather (1896–98; 1903–06), Bulong (1897), Rovers (1897), Britannia (1897), Cementers (1898), Kanowna (1899–1901), Paddington (1899), Coolgardie (1901–03; 1905–06), Trafalgar (1902–05), Horseshoe Warriors (1903–08), City (1903), Boulder Stars (1905–06) and Norseman (1971–72; 1974–82).

Premierships

List of premiers
The complete list of premiers teams is detailed below.

2012 ladder

2013 ladder

2014 ladder

2015 ladder

2016 ladder

2017 ladder

2018 ladder

2019 ladder

2020 (no season due to Covid-19 restrictions)

Notable players 
Hugh Gavin (Boulder City/Boulder Stars/Mines Rovers) – captained  in 1904.
George Krepp (Boulder City) – won a Sandover Medal for Swan Districts in 1936.
Gordon Maffina (Boulder City) – won a Sandover Medal for Claremont in 1949 and a Simpson Medal in 1951.
Phil Matson (Boulder City) – captained WA at the 1914 Sydney Carnival.
Stephen Michael (Boulder City) – won the 1980 and 1981 Sandover Medals, and the 1983 Simpson Medal. Inducted into the Australian Football Hall of Fame.
Bert Renfrey (Boulder City) – Captain of the undefeated 1911 South Australian state team.
Alec Robinson (Boulder City)
 Frank Hailwood (Boulder City) 150 games for Collingwood (1894-1904)
Jack Rocchi (Boulder City) – won the 1928 Sandover Medal for South Fremantle.
Dave Cuzens (Kalgoorlie City) – won 's best & fairest in 1958 and 1959.
Jerry Dolan (Kalgoorlie City)
Ted Holdsworth (Kalgoorlie City) – named at full-forward in the Swan Districts Team of the Century.
Jim Gosnell (Kalgoorlie Railways) – won the 1924 Sandover Medal.
Steve Marsh (Kalgoorlie Railways) – 1952 Sandover Medallist and West Australian Football Hall of Fame Legend.
Alexander McKenzie (Kalgoorlie City) – Four time Port Adelaide leading goal-kicker. Played for South Australia in 1892 and 1894.
Ted Rowell (Kalgoorlie Railways)
John Quinn Sr. (White Feather/Kanowna) – Port Adelaide captain in 1904-1905, father of champion players Tom Quinn and Bob Quinn.
John Woollard (Mines Rovers/Kalgoorlie City) – Port Adelaide captain in 1910.
Lou Daily (Mines Rovers) – won the 1935 Sandover Medal for Subiaco.
Alec Epis (Mines Rovers)
Tom Outridge (Mines Rovers) – inaugural winner of the Sandover Medal in 1921.
"Nipper" Truscott (Mines Rovers) – inducted into the Australian Football Hall of Fame.
Eddie Betts (Mines Rovers) – 's leading goalkicker in 2010 and 2012.
Dom Sheed (Mines Rovers) - West Coast premiership player.
Joe Fanchi (Mines Rovers) - Premiership player for West Perth kicked the winning goal for WA against Victoria 1961 National Carnival

See also
 Australian rules football in the Goldfields region of Western Australia

References

 
Australian rules football competitions in Western Australia
Sports leagues established in 1896